Justicia nuriana is a plant species endemic to eastern Venezuela. It is known from the State of Bolívar, Altiplanicie de Nuria.

Justicia nurianais an herb up to 1 m tall. Leaves are broadly oblong to ovate, up to 22 cm long. Flowers are borne in spikes at the end of branches. Capsule is egg-shaped (unusual for the genus), up to 13 mm long.

References 

nuriana
Flora of Venezuela